Vrbjani may refer to:
 Vrbjani, Krivogaštani, North Macedonia
 Vrbjani, Mavrovo and Rostuša, North Macedonia